Heidesee is a municipality in the district of Dahme-Spreewald in Brandenburg, which is located in the eastern part of Germany.

Demography

Organization

Neighbourhoods
Heidesee consists of 11 villages, which were united to one town in 2003. These villages are:

 Bindow
 Blossin 
 Dannenreich
 Dolgenbrodt
 Friedersdorf
 Gräbendorf 
 Gussow
 Kolberg
 Prieros
 Streganz
 Wolzig

Coat of arms
The coat of arms of the village Gräbendorf is used for entire town, since the unification in 2003. It shows an egret beside a leaf of an oak.

Culture and sights

Sights
 Heimathaus Prieros (small museum)
 church Prieros
 church Gräbendorf
 landing stage / harbour Heidesee
 Haus des Waldes (house of forest) Gräbendorf

Nature
 Wolziger See
 natural park Dahme-Heideseen
 landscape conservation area Dubrow

References

Localities in Dahme-Spreewald